Evagetes is a genus of spider wasps from the family Pompilidae. There are 72 described species, of which 58 are found in the Palaearctic region, 11 in the Nearctic region, with a few penetrating to the Afrotropical, Oriental and Neotropic regions.  Evagetes wasps are kleptoparasitic on other pompilid wasps, especially the genera Arachnospila, Anoplius, Episyron and Pompilus, digging into their sealed burrows, eating the host egg and replacing it with an egg of its own.  Evagetes wasps are characterised by their very short antennae. Most are species are black with the base of the antennae rufous, several Evagetes species are very metallic bluish insects.

The type species was named by Lepeletier as Evagetes bicolor in 1845 but this has since been recognised as a synonym for E. dubius which was originally named Aporus dubius.

Species
The following is a list of selected species

Evagetes alamannicus (Bluthgen, 1944)
Evagetes anatolicus Van der Smissen, 2003
Evagetes baguenae Junco y Reyes, 1960
Evagetes cabrerai (Junco y Reyes, 1944)
Evagetes calefactus Evans, 1966
Evagetes crassicornis (Shuckard, 1837)
Evagetes daisetzusanus Ishikawa 1960
Evagetes deiranbo Ishikawa 1960
Evagetes dubius (Vander Linden, 1827)
Evagetes elongatus (Lepeletier, 1845)
Evagetes fatimaae Wolf, 1990
Evagetes fabrei Van der Smissen, 2003
Evagetes fortunatus Wolf, 1970
Evagetes fortunatarum Wolf, 1980
Evagetes gibbulus (Lepeletier, 1845)
Evagetes gusenleitneri Wolf 1988
Evagetes hyacinthinus Cresson 1867
Evagetes iconionus Wolf, 1970
Evagetes ingenuus Cresson 1867
Evagetes implicatus Haupt, 1941
Evagetes ishikawai Lelei 1995
Evagetes juncoi Wolf, 1970
Evagetes littoralis (Wesmael, 1851)
Evagetes longispinosus Wolf, 1990
Evagetes macswaini Evans 1957
Evagetes magrettii (Kohl, 1886)
Evagetes meriane Van der Smissen, 2003
Evagetes mochii Priesner, 1955
Evagetes mohave (Banks, 1933)
Evagetes nasobema Wolf, 1970
Evagetes nitidulus (Guerin, 1838)
Evagetes orientalis Lelej & Loktiniov 2009
Evagetes orichalceus (Saunders 1901)
Evagetes padrinus (Viereck, 1903)
Evagetes palmatus (Haupt, 1930)
Evagetes parifomarvicus (Sustera, 1924)
Evagetes parvus Cresson 1865
Evagetes paulinus Wolf 1970
Evagetes pectinipes (Linnaeus, 1758)
Evagetes piechockii Wolf 1981
Evagetes piliferus Van der Smissen, 2003
Evagetes pilosellus (Wesmael, 1851)
Evagetes pontomoravicus (Sustera, 1938)
Evagetes proximus (Dahlbom, 1843)
Evagetes pseudoleucopterus Wolf 1970
Evagetes sabulosus Tournier, 1889
Evagetes sahlbergi (Morawitz, 1893)
Evagetes servillei Costa, 1882
Evagetes siculus (Lepeletier, 1845)
Evagetes subangulatus Banks 1919
Evagetes subglaber (Haupt, 1941)
Evagetes subnudus (Haupt, 1942)
Evagetes taiwanus Tsuneki 1989
Evagetes transbaicalicus Lelei 1995
Evagetes trispinosus (Kohl, 1886)
Evagetes tumidosus (Tournier, 1890)
Evagetes tumidinus Wolf, 1970
Evagetes yezoensis Ishikawa 1960
Evagetes zonatus (Haupt 1930)

References

Hymenoptera genera
Pompilinae
Taxa named by Amédée Louis Michel le Peletier